Palenque, also anciently known in the Itza Language as Lakamhaʼ ("Big Water or Big Waters"), was a Maya city state in southern Mexico that perished in the 8th century. The Palenque ruins date from ca. 226 BC to ca. 799 AD. After its decline, it was overgrown by the jungle of cedar, mahogany, and sapodilla trees, but has since been excavated and restored.

Palenque is a medium-sized site, smaller than Tikal, Chichen Itza, or Copán, but it contains some of the finest architecture, sculpture, roof comb and bas-relief carvings that the Mayas produced. Much of the history of Palenque has been reconstructed from reading the hieroglyphic inscriptions on the many monuments; historians now have a long sequence of the ruling dynasty of Palenque in the 5th century and extensive knowledge of the city-state's rivalry with other states such as Calakmul and Toniná. The most famous ruler of Palenque was K'inich Janaab Pakal, or Pacal the Great, whose tomb has been found and excavated in the Temple of the Inscriptions. By 2005, the discovered area covered up to 2.5 km2 (1sq mi), but it is estimated that less than 10% of the total area of the city is explored, leaving more than a thousand structures still covered by jungle. Palenque received 920,470 visitors in 2017.

History
Mythological beings using a variety of emblem glyphs in their titles suggests a complex early history. For instance, Kʼukʼ Bahlam I, the supposed founder of the Palenque dynasty, is called a Toktan Ajaw in the text of the Temple of the Foliated Cross.

The famous structures that we know today probably represent a rebuilding effort in response to the attacks by the city of Calakmul and its client states in 599 and 611. One of the main figures responsible for rebuilding Palenque and for a renaissance in the city's art and architecture is also one of the best-known Maya Ajaw, Kʼinich Janaabʼ Pakal (Pacal the Great), who ruled from 615 to 683. He is known through his funerary monument dubbed the Temple of Inscriptions, after the lengthy text preserved in the temple's superstructure. At the time Alberto Ruz Lhuillier excavated Pakal's tomb, it was the richest and best preserved of any scientifically excavated burial then known from the ancient Americas. It held this position until the discovery of the rich Moche burials at Sipan, Peru and the recent discoveries at Copan and Calakmul.

Beside the attention that K'inich Janaab' Pakal's tomb brought to Palenque, the city is historically significant for its extensive hieroglyphic corpus composed during the reigns of Janaab' Pakal, his son Kʼinich Kan Bahlam II, and his grandson K'inich Akal Mo' Naab', and for being the location where Heinrich Berlin and later Linda Schele and Peter Mathews outlined the first dynastic list for any Maya city. The work of Tatiana Proskouriakoff as well as that of Berlin, Schele, Mathews, and others, initiated the intense historical investigations that characterized much of the scholarship on the ancient Maya from the 1960s to the present. The extensive iconography and textual corpus has also allowed for study of Classic period Maya mythology and ritual practice.

Rulers
A list of possible and known Maya rulers of the city, with dates of their reigns:

Early Classic period
The first ajaw, or king, of B'aakal that we know of was K'uk Balam (Quetzal Jaguar), who governed for four years starting in the year 431. After him, a king came to power, nicknamed "Casper" by archaeologists. The next two kings were probably Caspers sons. Little was known about the first of these, B'utz Aj Sak Chiik, until 1994, when a tablet was found describing a ritual for the king. The first tablet mentioned his successor Ahkal Mo' Naab I as a teenage prince, and therefore it is believed that there was a family relation between them. For unknown reasons, Akhal Mo' Naab I had great prestige, so the kings who succeeded him were proud to be his descendants.

When Ahkal Mo' Naab I died in 524, there was an interregnum of four years, before the following king was crowned at Toktán in 529. K'an Joy Chitam I governed for 36 years. His sons Ahkal Mo' Naab II and K'an B'alam I were the first kings who used the title Kinich, which means "the great sun". This word was used also by later kings. B'alam was succeeded in 583 by Yohl Ik'nal, who was supposedly his daughter. The inscriptions found in Palenque document a battle that occurred under her government in which troops from Calakmul invaded and sacked Palenque, a military feat without known precedents. These events took place in 599.

A second victory by Calakmul occurred some twelve years later, in 611, under the government of Aj Ne' Yohl Mat, son of Yohl Iknal. In this occasion, the king of Calakmul entered Palenque in person, consolidating a significant military disaster, which was followed by an epoch of political disorder. Aj Ne' Yohl Mat was to die in 612.

Late Classic period

B'aakal began the Late Classic period in the throes of the disorder created by the defeats before Calakmul. The glyphic panels at the Temple of Inscriptions, which records the events at this time, relates that some fundamental annual religious ceremonies were not performed in 613, and at this point states: "Lost is the divine lady, lost is the king." Mentions of the government at the time have not been found.

It is believed that after the death of Aj Ne' Yohl Mat, Janaab Pakal, also called Pakal I, took power thanks to a political agreement. Janaab Pakal assumed the functions of the ajaw (king) but never was crowned. He was succeeded in 612 by his daughter, the queen Sak K'uk', who governed for only three years until her son was old enough to rule. It is considered that the dynasty was reestablished from then on, so B'aakal retook the path of glory and splendor.

The grandson of Janaab Pakal is the most famous of the Mayan kings, K'inich Janaab' Pakal, also known as Pakal the Great. He began rule at the age of 12 years after his mother Sak Kuk resigned as queen after three years, thus passing power on to him. Pakal the Great reigned in Palenque from 615 to 683, and his mother remained an important force for the first 25 years of his rule.  She may have ruled jointly with him. Known as the favorite of the gods, he carried Palenque to new levels of splendor, in spite of having come to power when the city was at a low point. Pakal married the princess of Oktán, Lady Tzakbu Ajaw (also known as Ahpo-Hel) in 624 and had at least three children.

Most of the palaces and temples of Palenque were constructed during his government; the city flourished as never before, eclipsing Tikal. The central complex, known as The Palace, was enlarged and remodeled on various occasions, notably in the years 654, 661, and 668. In this structure, is a text describing how in that epoch Palenque was newly allied with Tikal, and also with Yaxchilan, and that they were able to capture the six enemy kings of the alliance. Not much more had been translated from the text.

After the death of Pakal in 683, his older son K'inich Kan B'alam assumed the kingship of B'aakal, who in turn was succeeded in 702 by his brother K'inich K'an Joy Chitam II. The first continued the architectural and sculptural works that were begun by his father, as well as finishing the construction of the famous tomb of Pakal. Pakal's sarcophagus, built for a very tall man, held the richest collection of jade seen in a Mayan tomb. A jade mosaic mask was placed over his face, and a suit made of jade adorned his body, with each piece hand-carved and held together by gold wire.

Furthermore, K'inich Kan B'alam I began ambitious projects, including the Group of the Crosses. Thanks to numerous works begun during his government, now we have portraits of this king, found in various sculptures. His brother succeeded him continuing construction and art with the same enthusiasm, reconstructing and enlarging the north side of the Palace. Thanks to the reign of these three kings, B'aakal had a century of growth and splendor.

In 711, Palenque was sacked by the realm of Toniná, and the old king K'inich K'an Joy Chitam II was taken prisoner. It is not known what the final fate of the king was, and it is presumed that he was executed in Toniná. For 10 years there was no king. Finally, K'inich Ahkal Mo' Nab' III was crowned in 722. Although the new king belonged to the royalty, there is no evidence that he was the direct inheritor of K'inich K'an Joy Chitam II. It is believed, therefore, that this coronation was a break in the dynastic line, and probably K'inich Ahkal Nab' arrived to power after years of maneuvering and forging political alliances. This king, his son, and grandson governed until the end of the 8th century. Little is known about this period, except that, among other events, the war with Toniná continued, where there are hieroglyphics that record a new defeat of Palenque.

Occasionally city-state lords were women. Lady Sak Kuk ruled at Palenque for at least three years starting in 612 CE, before she passed her title to her son. However, these female rulers were accorded male attributes. They were presented as more masculine, since they had assumed roles that were typically held by men.

Abandonment
During the 8th century, B'aakal came under increasing stress, in concert with most other Classic Mayan city-states, and there was no new elite construction in the ceremonial center sometime after 800. An agricultural population continued to live here for a few generations, then the site was abandoned and was slowly grown over by the forest. The district was very sparsely populated when the Spanish first arrived in the 1520s.

Art and architecture
Important structures at Palenque include:

Temple of the Inscriptions

The Temple of Inscriptions had begun perhaps as early as 675 as the funerary monument of Hanab-Pakal. The temple superstructure houses the second longest glyphic text known from the Maya world (the longest is the Hieroglyphic Stairway at Copan). The Temple of the Inscriptions records approximately 180 years of the city's history from the 4th through 12th K'atun. The focal point of the narrative records K'inich Janaab' Pakal's K'atun period-ending rituals focused on the icons of the city's patron deities prosaically known collectively as the Palenque Triad or individually as GI, GII, and GIII.

The Pyramid measures 60 meters wide, 42.5 meters deep and 27.2 meters high. The Summit temple measures 25.5 meters wide, 10.5 meters deep and 11.4 meters high. The largest stones weigh 12 to 15 tons. These were on top of the Pyramid. The Total volume of pyramid and temple is 32,500 cu. meters.

In 1952 Alberto Ruz Lhuillier removed a stone slab in the floor of the back room of the temple superstructure to reveal a passageway (filled in shortly before the city's abandonment and reopened by archeologists) leading through a long stairway to Pakal's tomb. The tomb itself is remarkable for its large carved sarcophagus, the rich ornaments accompanying Pakal, and for the stucco sculpture decorating the walls of the tomb. Unique to Pakal's tomb is the psychoduct, which leads from the tomb itself, up the stairway and through a hole in the stone covering the entrance to the burial. This psychoduct is perhaps a physical reference to concepts about the departure of the soul at the time of death in Maya eschatology where in the inscriptions the phrase ochb'ihaj sak ik'il (the white breath road-entered) is used to refer to the leaving of the soul. A find such as this is greatly important because it demonstrated for the first time the temple usage as being multifaceted. These pyramids were, for the first time, identified as temples and also funerary structures.
 
The much-discussed iconography of the sarcophagus lid depicts Pakal in the guise of one of the manifestations of the Maya maize god emerging from the maws of the underworld.

The temple also has a duct structure that still is not completely understood by archaeologists.  It has been suggested that the duct aligns with the winter solstice and that the sun shines down on Pakal's tomb.

Temples of the Cross group

The Temple of the Cross, Temple of the Sun, and Temple of the Foliated Cross are a set of graceful temples atop step pyramids, each with an elaborately carved relief in the inner chamber depicting two figures presenting ritual objects and effigies to a central icon. Earlier interpretations had argued that the smaller figure was that of K'inich Janaab' Pakal while the larger figure was K'inich Kan B'ahlam. However, it is now known based on a better understanding of the iconography and epigraphy that the central tablet depicts two images of Kan B'ahlam. The smaller figure shows K'inich Kan B'ahlam during a rite of passage ritual at the age of six (9.10.8.9.3 9 Akbal 6 Xul) while the larger is of his accession to kingship at the age of 48. These temples were named by early explorers; the cross-like images in two of the reliefs actually depict the tree of creation at the center of the world in Maya mythology.

Palace

The Palace, a complex of several connected and adjacent buildings and courtyards, was built by several generations on a wide artificial terrace during four century period. The Palace was used by the Mayan aristocracy for bureaucratic functions, entertainment, and ritualistic ceremonies. The Palace is located in the center of the ancient city.

Within the Palace there are numerous sculptures and bas-relief carvings that have been conserved. The Palace most unusual and recognizable feature is the four-story tower known as The Observation Tower. The Observation Tower like many other buildings at the site exhibit a mansard-like roof. The A-shaped Corbel arch is an architectural motif observed throughout the complex. The Corbel arches require a large amount of masonry mass and are limited to a small dimensional ratio of width to height providing the characteristic high ceilings and narrow passageways. The Palace was equipped with numerous large baths and saunas which were supplied with fresh water by an intricate water system. An aqueduct, constructed of great stone blocks with a three-meter-high vault, diverts the Otulum River to flow underneath the main plaza. The Palace is the largest building complex in Palenque measuring 97 meters by 73 meters at its base.

Other notable buildings

 The Temple of the Skull has a skull on one of the pillars.
 Temple XIII contained the Tomb of the Red Queen, an unknown noble woman, possibly the wife of Pakal, discovered in 1994.  The remains in the sarcophagus were completely covered with a bright red powder made of cinnabar.
 The Temple of The Jaguar (a.k.a. The Temple of the Beautiful Relief) at a distance of some 200 meters south of the main group of temples; its name came from the elaborate bas-relief carving of a king seated on a throne in the form of a jaguar.
 Structure XII with a bas-relief carving of the God of Death.
 Temple of the Count another elegant Classic Palenque temple, which got its name from the fact that early explorer Jean Frederic Waldeck lived in the building for some time, and Waldeck claimed to be a count.

The site also has a number of other temples, tombs, and elite residences, some a good distance from the center of the site, a court for playing the Mesoamerican Ballgame, and an interesting stone bridge over the Otulum River some distance below the Aqueduct.

Modern investigations

After de la Nada's brief account of the ruins, no attention was paid to them until 1773 when one Don Ramon de Ordoñez y Aguilar examined Palenque and sent a report to the Capitan General in Antigua Guatemala, a further examination was made in 1784 saying that the ruins were of particular interest, so two years later surveyor and architect Antonio Bernasconi was sent with a small military force under Colonel Antonio del Río to examine the site in more detail. Del Rio's forces smashed through several walls to see what could be found, doing a fair amount of damage to the Palace, while Bernasconi made the first map of the site as well as drawing copies of a few of the bas-relief figures and sculptures. Draughtsman Luciano Castañeda made more drawings in 1807, and a book on Palenque, Descriptions of the Ruins of an Ancient City, discovered near Palenque, was published in London in 1822 based on the reports of those last two expeditions together with engravings based on Bernasconi and Castañedas drawings; two more publications in 1834 contained descriptions and drawings based on the same sources.

Juan Galindo visited Palenque in 1831, and filed a report with the Central American government. He was the first to note that the figures depicted in Palenque's ancient art looked like the local Native Americans; some other early explorers, even years later, attributed the site to such distant peoples as Egyptians, Polynesians, or the Lost Tribes of Israel.

Starting in 1832 Jean Frederic Waldeck spent two years at Palenque making numerous drawings, but most of his work was not published until 1866. Meanwhile, the site was visited in 1840 first by Patrick Walker and Herbert Caddy on a mission from the governor of British Honduras, and then by John Lloyd Stephens and Frederick Catherwood who published an illustrated account the following year which was greatly superior to the previous accounts of the ruins.

Désiré Charnay took the first photographs of Palenque in 1858, and returned in 1881–1882.  Alfred Maudslay encamped at the ruins in 1890–1891 and took extensive photographs of all the art and inscriptions he could find, and made paper and plaster molds of many of the inscriptions, and detailed maps and drawings, setting a high standard for all future investigators to follow. Maudslay learned the technique of making the papier mache molds of the sculptures from Frenchman Desire Charnay.

Several other expeditions visited the ruins before Frans Blom of Tulane University in 1923, who made superior maps of both the main site and various previously neglected outlying ruins and filed a report for the Mexican government on recommendations on work that could be done to preserve the ruins.

From 1949 through 1952 Alberto Ruz Lhuillier supervised excavations and consolidations of the site for Mexico's National Institute of Anthropology and History (INAH); it was Ruz Lhuillier who was the first person to gaze upon Pacal the Great's tomb in over a thousand years. Ruz worked for four years at the Temple of Inscriptions before unearthing the tomb. Further INAH work was done in lead by Jorge Acosta into the 1970s.

In 1973, the first of the very productive Palenque Mesa Redonda (Round table) conferences was held here on the inspiration of Merle Greene Robertson; thereafter every few years leading Mayanists would meet at Palenque to discuss and examine new findings in the field. Meanwhile, Robertson was conducting a detailed examination of all art at Palenque, including recording all the traces of color on the sculptures.

The 1970s also saw a small museum built at the site.

In the last 15 or 20 years, a great deal more of the site has been excavated, but currently, archaeologists estimate that only 5% of the total city has been uncovered.

In 2010, Pennsylvania State University researchers, Christopher Duffy and Kirk French, identified the Piedras Bolas Aqueduct as a pressurised aqueduct, the earliest known in the New World. They were unable to identify the use for this man-made feature.

In June 2022, archaeologists from the Mexico's National Institute of Anthropology and History (INAH) announced the discovery of a 1,300-year-old nine-inch-tall plaster head statue indicating a young Hun Hunahpu, the Maya’s mythological maize god. The figure's semi-shaved haircut that resembles ripe corn gives reason to the possibility that it is a young maize god. Researchers assume that the Mayan inhabitants of Palenque possibly placed a large stone statuette over a pond to represent the entrance to the underworld. According to archaeologist Arnoldo González Cruz, the Mayan people symbolically shuttered the pool by breaking up some of the plaster and filling it with animal remains, including pottery fragments, carved bone remains, shells,   obsidian arrowheads, beads, vegetables, and others.

Palenque National ParkPalenque National Park''' was designated in 1981 by the Mexican government. It covers an area of 17.72 km2, which encompasses the ancient city and the hills to the south. The park includes a family camp site.

See also
List of Mesoamerican pyramids
List of megalithic sites
Maya script
Temple 20

Notes

References

  (1963). The Palenque Triad. Journal de la Société des Américanistes, n.s. 5(52):91–99. Paris.
  (2005). The Mask Flange Iconographic Complex [electronic resource]: The Art, Ritual, and History of a Maya Sacred Image. Doctoral dissertation, The University of Texas at Austin. Available electronically from http://hdl.handle.net/2152/1027.
The Cosmogonic Symbolism of the Corbeled Vault in Maya Architecture. Mexicon Volume XXIV, No. 2, April.
  (1991). Iconographic heritage of the Maya Jester God. In Sixth Palenque Round Table, 1986. Virginia M. Fields, ed. pp. 167–174 Palenque Round Table (6 session, 1986) University of Oklahoma Press Norman.
"Creation Redux: new thoughts on Maya cosmology from epigraphy, iconography, and archaeology". PARI Journal 1(2):1–8, 18.
 
  (1996) Symbolic Sweatbaths of the Maya: Architectural Meaning in the Cross Group at Palenque, Mexico. Latin American Antiquity, 7(2), pp. 132–151.
  (1965). "The Birth of the Gods at Palenque". In Estudios de Cultura Maya 5, 93–134. México: Universidad Nacional Autónoma de Mexico.
  (1976). "A Rationale for the Initial Date of the Temple of the Cross at Palenque". In The Art, Iconography, and Dynastic History of Palenque, Part III: Proceedings of the Segunda Mesa Redonda de Palenque, ed. Merle Greene Robertson, 211-224.Pebble Beach, Ca.: Robert Louis Stevenson School.
  (1980). "Some Problems in the Interpretation of the Mythological Portion of the Hieroglyphic Text of the temple of the Cross at Palenque". In The Third Palenque Round Table, 1978, Part 2, ed. Merle Greene Robertson, 99-115. Palenque Round Table Series Vol. 5. Austin: University of Texas Press.
  (1985). "The Identities of the Mythological Figures in the 'Cross Group' of Inscriptions at Palenque". In Fourth Round Table of Palenque, 1980, vol. 6, gen. ed. Merle Greene Robertson; vol. ed., Elizabeth P. Benson, 45-58. San Francisco: Pre-Columbian Art Research Institute.
 
 
 
American Antiquity, 25 (2):225–236.
"Thematic and Compositional Variation in Palenque Region Incensarios". In Tercera Mesa Redonda de Palenque, Vol. IV, edited Merle Greene Robertson and Donnan C. Jeffers, 19–30. Palenque: Pre-Columbian Art Research, and Monterey: Herald Printers.
 
  (1991). The Sculpture of Palenque Vol. IV. Princeton University Press, Princeton.
  (1958). Exploraciones arqueológicas en Palenque: 1953. Anales del Instituto Nacional de AntropologÌa e Historia. Vol. 10(39):69–116. Mexico.
  (1956) Exploraciones en la Pirámide de la Cruz Foliada. Informe 5. Dirección de Monumentos Prehispánicos. Instituto Nacional de AntropologÌa e Historia, Mexico.
  (1999) The Seventy Wonders of the Ancient World. Thames and Hudson.
  (1976), Accession Iconography of Chan-Bahlum in the Group of the Cross at Palenque. In The Art, Iconography, and Dynastic History of Palenque, Part III. Proceedings of the Segunda Mesa Redonda de Palenque, ed. Merle Greene Robertson, 9–34. Pebble Beach, Ca.: Robert Luis Stevenson School.
  (1979), Genealogical Documentation in the Tri-Figure Panels at Palenque. In Tercera Mesa Redonda de Palenque, Vol. IV, edited Merle Greene Robertson, 41–70. Palenque: Pre-Columbian Art Research, and Monterey: Herald Printers.
  (1985), "Some Suggested Readings of the Event and Office of Heir-Designate at Palenque". In Phoneticism in Mayan Hieroglyphic Writing, 287–307. Albany: Institute of Mesoamerican Studies, State University of New York at Albany.
  (1986), "Architectural Development and Political History at Palenque". In City-States of the Maya: Art and Architecture, edited Elizabeth P. Benson, 110-138. Denver: Rocky Mountain Institute for Pre-Columbian Studies.
  (1992), Notebook for the XVIth Maya Hieroglyphic Writing Workshop at Texas. Austin, Texas: University of Texas at Austin.
 
 
  (2005) The Inscriptions from Temple XIX at Palenque. Pre-Columbian Art Research Institute. 
Pre-Columbian Art and Archaeology, 33''. Washington, D.C.: Dumbarton Oaks Research Library and Collection.
 Archaeology of Native North America, 2010, Dean R. Snow, Prentice-Hall, New York. pp.
  (1983) "The Ancient Maya" Stanford, California: Stanford University

External links

Maya Explorations Center.
Unaahil B'aak: The Temples of Palenque (Wesleyan University)   - Contains a learning objects program, panoramas, 3D models, and glyphs and translations.
Mesoweb's Palenque resources
animated 3D-reconstruction on Palenque-3D.com
The Tablet Of The 96 Hieroglyphs
The Ruins of Palenque: bilingual essay with audio
Drawings of the Palenque site from the Antonio del Rio 1784 expedition
Misty and Mystic - Palenque - Description and Photos
Estimating Palenque's population on Mesoweb (PDF)

 
Maya sites in Chiapas
Maya Classic Period
Archaeological museums in Mexico
Museums in Chiapas
Former populated places in Mexico
Populated places established in the 3rd century BC
Populated places disestablished in the 8th century
States and territories established in the 3rd century BC
States and territories disestablished in the 8th century
220s BC establishments
3rd-century BC establishments in the Maya civilization
799 disestablishments
8th-century disestablishments in the Maya civilization
Tourist attractions in Chiapas
World Heritage Sites in Mexico
City-states
National parks of Mexico
Protected areas of Chiapas
Petén–Veracruz moist forests